Exiguobacterium aurantiacum is a Gram-positive, alkaliphilic, halotolerant and non-spore-forming bacterium from the genus of Exiguobacterium which has been isolated from human blood.

References

Bacillaceae
Bacteria described in 1984